The third season of The Real Housewives of New Jersey, an American reality television series, was broadcast on Bravo. It aired from May 16, 2011 until October 23, 2011, and was primarily filmed in Franklin Lakes, New Jersey. Its executive producers are Rebecca Toth Diefenbach, Valerie Haselton, Lucilla D'Agostino, Jim Fraenkel, Omid Kahangi, Caroline Self, Tess Gamboa Meyers and Andy Cohen.

The Real Housewives of New Jersey focuses on the lives of Teresa Giudice, Jacqueline Laurita, Caroline Manzo, Melissa Gorga and Kathy Wakile. It consisted of twenty-one episodes.

Production and crew
The Real Housewives of New Jersey was officially renewed for a third season on August 31, 2010. The season premiere "In the Name of the Father" was aired on May 16, 2011, as a 90 minute special that delivered the highest rated season premiere in the network's history and the highest rated season premiere in The Real Housewives franchise at the time. The nineteenth episode "Portrait of an Italian Family" served as the season finale, and was aired on October 9, 2011. It was followed by a two-part reunion which marked the conclusion of the season and was broadcast on October 16, and October 23, 2011. Laurita didn't attend the season 3 reunion, due to a fight that had happened between her and Giudice days prior to the reunion taping. Season 4 had begun filming while season 3 was airing.

Rebecca Toth Diefenbach, Valerie Haselton, Lucilla D'Agostino, Jim Fraenkel, Omid Kahangi, Caroline Self, Tess Gamboa Meyers and Andy Cohen are recognized as the series' executive producers; it is produced and distributed by Sirens Media.

Cast and synopsis
In the third season, Danielle Staub departed from the series leaving room for Giudice's sister-in-law, Melissa Gorga and cousin, Kathy Wakile to join the cast. The Real Housewives of New Jersey season 3 was the only The Real Housewives series within the franchise that featured a main cast who were all married, until The Real Housewives of Miami also met the criterion starting with its third season.

With Dina Manzo leaving halfway through season 2, it allowed the spotlight of the Manzo family drama to shift to the Giuidce-Gorga family history. The season began with a Christening for Melissa's and Joey Gorga, Teresa Giudice's brother, son but things don't go to plan when a fight erupts between Joe and Teresa. The fight continues to snowball throughout the season for all those involved. Jacqueline and Caroline support Teresa throughout the season as she continues to feud with her family.

Episodes

References

External links

2011 American television seasons
New Jersey (season 3)